Carosone is an Italian surname. Notable people with the surname include:

Emily Carosone (born 1993), Italian-American softball player and coach
Paolo Carosone (born 1941), Italian painter, sculptor, etcher, and multimedia artist
Renato Carosone (1920–2001), Italian musician

Italian-language surnames